Natasha Johns-Messenger (born 1970) is an Australian conceptual artist and filmmaker, who has lived and worked in New York and Melbourne. Johns-Messenger is best known for her large-scale site-determined installations that examine spatial perception and light. Her work is a complex process of imitation, illusion and trickery, often activated by architectural interventions and optical physics.
 Johns-Messenger's practice includes photography, digital painting and sculpture.

Background 

Johns-Messenger is the great-granddaughter of Australian rugby legend Dally Messenger and sister of singer Julia Messenger. Johns-Messenger's mother, Catherine Marie Johns, is a poet and novelist in Australia and her works have been published in literary journals including Meanjin and Island Magazine. Her father, Dally Messenger III, is an author, noted for his books Ceremonies and Celebrations, Murphy's Law And The Pursuit Of Happiness: A History Of The Civil Celebrant Movement and for his general contribution to the Australian civil celebrant movement.

Career 

Johns-Messenger employs the principles of architecture, film and the visual arts to produce a new experiential sculptural framework. She creates representations or abstractions from the original architecture, using material devices such as, periscopic mirrors, live video projections and architectural mimicry to produce large-scale installations. Her interest in quantum physics, mathematics, seriality and geometry is also implemented within her practice.
Johns-Messenger critically examines the role of the body in space. Her primary concern with altering ordinary "ways of seeing" began during early childhood, where she spent days sketching, conceptualising and photographing shapes from ordinary objects.

Johns-Messenger commenced her art practice as a painter. She earned a Bachelor of Fine Arts with First Class Honours in 1994, and in 2000 she completed a Masters of Fine Arts (MFA) at the Royal Melbourne Institute of Technology (RMIT). She has exhibited at major institutions, including the Museum of Contemporary Art Australia in Sydney, the Australian Centre for Contemporary Art, Gertrude Contemporary Art Spaces and the  Contemporary Centre for Photography in Melbourne. 

In 2012 Johns-Messenger completed an MFA in Film at Columbia University, New York, marking a shift into narrative film, where she combines her interest with abstraction and the moving image into real time. Blackwood, her final graduate film at Columbia, won numerous awards at the 2012 Columbia University Film Festival, including the Alumni Award for Best Film, National Board of Review Motion Pictures Award and the Adrienne Shelly Foundation Best Director Award. Blackwood went on to premiere at the Warsaw Film Festival and was featured in 40 film festivals and won numerous awards. Her first film after graduation, Off-Ramp, won Best Student Film and Best Actress at the Los Angeles International Underground Film Festival.

Exhibitions

Johns-Messenger has been curated into major international group exhibitions alongside artists such as Dan Graham, James Turrell and Lawrence Weiner. In 2009/10 Johns-Messenger was commissioned by the New York Public Art Fund, for her work ThisSideIn and in 2010 created Recollection for No Longer Empty, New York at Governor’s Island and was a studio resident at the ISCP in New York (International Studio and Curatorial Program) under the Australia Council for the Arts, studio residency program. In 2007, she won the Den Haag Sculptuur Rabo Bank Prize presented to her by Queen Beatrix of the Netherlands, and in 2006 Johns-Messenger won the Melbourne Prize for Urban Sculpture with her then collaborative group OSW, Open Spatial Workshop (Bianca Hester, Scott Mitchell and Terri Bird).

Johns-Messenger's exhibitions have taken place in Japan, Bogota, China, The Netherlands, Taiwan and USA. Her public works can be seen all over the world, with her most recent work Alterview, which was commissioned by Percent For Art and the New York Department of Cultural Affairs, permanently located at Hunters Point, New York.

Other exhibitions include Yellow, 2011, at ACCA, The Australian Centre for Contemporary Art, Melbourne; Through to You, "Freedom-American Sculpture" The Hague (Den Haag), The Netherlands; Of Water, 2008, Gallery of Modern Art (GOMA), Brisbane; ISCP Open Studio Exhibition, ISCP, New York and Trappenhuis (Stairwell) Installation, Den Haag Sculptuur, Escher Museum, Netherlands; NEW06 at ACCA; Primavera 2004, Museum of Contemporary Art Australia (MCA), in Sydney; and Drift at the Perth Institute of Contemporary Arts (PICA) in Perth, Australia.

The 2020 Adelaide//International exhibition at the Samstag Museum in Adelaide centred around an installation called Somewhere Other by John Wardle Architects in collaboration with Johns-Messenger. It had also been Australia's entry in the 2018 Venice Architecture Biennale. Due to run from 28 February to 12 June, the exhibition was cut short by the closure of the Samstag in March 2020 owing to the COVID-19 pandemic in Australia.

References

Further reading 
Backhouse, Megan. Making Gertrude’s Walls Talk, The Age, The Culture, 27 November 2002
Colless, Edward. Inside the fantasy world of edgy, The Australian, 3 April 2006
Coslovich, Gabriella.The Tyranny of distance for Australian Art, The Age, 7 July 2007
Crafti Stephen. If they can make it there, Sydney Morning Herald, 2 May 2010
Crafti, Stephen. Master of Illusion Indesign Magazine, Issue 43, 2010 
Donald, Fiona. Strange Place, LIKE Art Magazine, No 11- Autumn 2000 
Easton,Craig. Natasha Johns-Messenger:HERE, Eyeline Contemporary Visual Arts, 2001
Frost, Andrew. Super glossy, Australia Style Magazine, Issue 64
Mathews, Hannah. Power to the People, Australian Centre for Contemporary Art, Melbourne, Australia, 2011
Meade, John. Sense of, LIKE Art Magazine, No 12- Winter 2000
Miles, Melissa. Turning on Axes of Light: Natasha Johns-Messenger & Leslie Eastman, No Longer Empty Catalogue Essay, 2011
Nelson, Robert. New Coat of Paint, The Age, 30 April 2008
Nelson, Robert. Breathing life into Space, The Age Review, 12 April 2006
Nelson, Robert Experimenta Vanishing Point, The Age Review, 28 September 2005 
Nelson, Robert. Artfair hits high mark, The Age, The Culture, Visual Arts, 3 October 2002
Pierini, Esther. Fixate, Art Monthly, 2000
Shannon, Julie. A double take in New York Space, Artery Issue 12, 2010
Rhodes, Kate, Heart of Glass: Reflection/Perception and the work of Natasha Johns-Messenger, LIKE Art Magazine, No 16, 2001
Sachs, Bernhard, HERE, Catalogue essay, Gertrude Contemporary Art Space, Melbourne Australia 2000
Strahan, Lucinda. Coming from the Right Angle, The Age Review, 17 January
The Arts Show (October), featured artist, hosted by Bruce Berryman, 3RRR-FM, 2002

External links 

  

1970 births
Living people
Australian conceptual artists
Women conceptual artists
RMIT University alumni
Australian filmmakers
Australian installation artists
Women installation artists
Australian photographers
21st-century Australian sculptors
Columbia University School of the Arts alumni
21st-century Australian women artists